Novotny Mähner Assoziierte (N+M, Novotny Mähner & Associates) is an architect company based in Offenbach am Main. It was founded by Fritz Novotny and Arthur Mähner. Their design is puristic and clear.

History

In 2007, the Frankfurt-based N+M architects (formerly Novotny Mähner), specialists in high-rise buildings and the health sector, became an active member of the ATP Group.  In 2009, the office of N+M architects was renamed in ATP N+M Architekten und Ingenieure GmbH. In 2014, the partnership with Frankfurt resulted in the creation of the health sector design company ATP health. In the same year, the office of ATP N+M Architekten und Ingenieure GmbH was renamed in ATP Frankfurt.

Many skyscrapers in Frankfurt were planned by the office as well as other structures worldwide.

Skyscrapers

 Hochhaus Mercedesstraße 
 Büro Center Nibelungenplatz, 1966 
 Garden Towers, 1976 
 Stern Plaza, 1992 
 Trianon, 1993 
 American Express (Frankfurt), 1993 
 Taunus Tower, 1996 
 Limes Haus I, 1996 
 Eurotheum, 1998–2001 
 Sunflower Tower Beijing 1999 
 Gallileo, 2003 
 City Tower, 2003

Buildings

 Volksschule Großkrotzenburg (Kreis Offenbach), 1964 
 Gesamtschule Königstein/Taunus, 1972 
 Service Rechenzentrum der Dt. DATEL, Darmstadt, 1973 
 Erich-Ollenhauer-House, Bonn (Headquarters of the SPD 1975–99), 1975 
 German Embassy, Cairo 1978–79 
 Chinese Embassy, Berlin/GDR
 Euroforum building, Luxembourg, 1996 
 Hyatt Regency, Cologne, 1985–1988 
 Friedrich-Ebert-Stiftung, Bonn 
 Hospital in Merano, Italy „Franz Tappeiner“ (Ospedale di Merano), 1996 
 MDR Hörfunkzentrale (Halle), 1998 
 Friedrich-Ebert-Stiftung, Berlin, 1999 
 Stilwerk (Berlin), 1999 
 Humboldt Park Munich 
 Lahnstraße 60–68, Frankfurt, 2001 
 Deutsche Bank (Berlin), 2005 
 Main Triangel, Frankfurt, 2006

External links 

 Homepage Novotny Mähner Assoziierte

Architecture firms of Germany